On and Off may refer to:

"On and Off", a 1976 song by David Ruffin from Everything's Coming Up Love
"On and Off", a 1981 song by Barbara Mason
"On & Off" (Krista Siegfrids song), 2015
"On and Off" (Maggie Rogers song), 2017
On and Off, a 2007 album by Mary Halvorson
On & Off (TV series), a South Korean television program

See also
"Off & On", a 2011 song by Sophie Ellis-Bextor
 On-off (disambiguation)